Roger Testu, known as Tetsu (12 July 1913, Bourges, Cher – 2 February 2008) was a French cartoonist. He started his career as a painter and in the 1950s started drawing cartoons, while continuing to paint. He worked for magazines including Paris Match, The Barber Magazine, France Dimanche and Ici Paris. He produced "Search South of France" which were two collections of his drawings and paintings. In 2008 he died age 94. The official cause of death is unknown.

1913 births
2008 deaths
Artists from Bourges
French cartoonists